The Guyanese records in swimming are the fastest ever performances of swimmers from Guyana, which are recognised and ratified by the Guyana Amateur Swimming Association.

All records were set in finals unless noted otherwise.

Long Course (50 m)

Men

Women

Short Course (25 m)

Men

Women

References

Guyana
Records
Swimming